Ye may refer to:

Ye, Ayeyarwady Division
Ye, Mon State

Township capitals of Myanmar